Deanna Templeton (born July 19, 1969 in Huntington Beach, California) is an American artist working primarily in photography. She lives and works in Huntington Beach.

Early life
Deanna Templeton was born and raised in Huntington Beach, California. As a teenager, she discovered and was inspired by punk rock.

Deanna met Ed Templeton at a Red Hot Chili Peppers concert when he was 15 and she was 18. She recalls, "[h]e looked older and I looked younger so we met somewhere in the middle." Two weeks later, they went on a date, and two weeks after that, they were girlfriend and boyfriend. The two were married three years later in 1991. They both became vegetarian in 1990, vegan in 1991, and have not consumed meat or dairy products since.

Art career
Templeton started to pursue photography at the age of 15 when her mother gifted her a camera. She used the camera to explore and document the local Los Angeles punk scene.

Early in her photography career, Templeton traveled with her husband and other professional skateboarders on their international tours, documenting the scene. Templeton's photographs from that period embody a unique perspective of skateboarding and skateboard culture because they reflect a female perspective of a sport which, at the time, was documented and dominated by men. In 2007, she published the book Your Logo Here; the photographs capture young girls offering their bodies to their skateboard idols for them to sign and for skate companies to "brand" with spray paint templates. Photographs from Your Logo Here culminated in an exhibition titled Scratch My Name On Your Arm, which traveled throughout Europe in 2009; drawing inspiration from the punk scene that inspired her as a teenager, Templeton appropriated her exhibition's title from a Smith's song.

She continued to explore the body with her 2016 book Swimming Pool, in which she photographed her friends who were invited to skinny dip in her pool; she documented these scenes over eight years in both color and black-and-white photographs.

For around 20 years, Templeton made street portraits of young women that she collected in the book What She Said (2021). The portraits are contrasted with journal entries from her own adolescence in the 1980s.

Exhibitions

Solo
2005: Only Once, Museum Het Domein, Sittard, Netherlands
2007: Your Logo Here,  Australian Centre for Photography, Sydney, Australia
2008: The Swimming Pool, New Image Art, Los Angeles, California
2009: Scratch My Name on Your Arm, NRW-Forum, Dusseldorf, Germany, 2009
2010: Scratch My Name On Your Arm, Schunck Museum, Heerlen, Netherlands
2016: What She Said, Little Big Man Gallery, Los Angeles, CA
2019: Contemporary Suburbium, Utah Museum of Contemporary Art, Salt Lake City, UT, 2019

Group
2003 Skate Culture: The Art of Skateboarding, Contemporary Art Center of Virginia, Virginia Beach, VA
2005 Everyone Sees the Sun, Loyal Gallery, Stockholm, Sweden
2006 Skate Culture, Preus Museum, Horten, Norway
2008 Mooi niet, Government, Maastricht, Netherlands
2008 Sea No Evil, Riverside Art Museum, Riverside, CA
2009 Rites De Passage, Schunck Museum, Heerlen, Netherlands
2018–2019: This Land, Pier 24 Photography, San Francisco, CA

Publications

Photography books by Templeton
Cube, Sartoria, 2005. 
Your Logo Here, P.A.M., 2007. 
17 Days, Self-published, 2008. 
Scratch My Name on Your Arm, Heerlen: Schunck, 2011. .
They Should Never Touch The Ground, Los Angeles: Deadbeat Club, 2015.
The Swimming Pool, Portland: Nazraeli, 2016. .
The Moon Has Lost Her Memory, Tokyo: Super Labo, 2017. 
Contemporary Suburbium, Portland: Nazraeli Press, 2017. . Co-Authored by Ed Templeton.
Yesterday, Tokyo: Super Labo, 2019. 
What She Said. London: Mack, 2021. .

Publications with contributions by Templeton
Body: The Photography Book, London: Thames & Hudson. 2019. 
This Land, San Francisco: Pier 24 Photography, 2018. Exhibition catalogue. . 
The Swimming Pool in Photography, Berlin: Hatje Cantz, 2018. .
 Girl on Girl: Art and Photography in the Age of the Female Gaze, London: Laurence King, 2017. 
Le Petit Voyeur: Photo Album Volume 1 (Deanna Templeton Cover), Paris: Le Petit Voyeur, 2017.

References

1969 births
Living people
American photographers
People from Huntington Beach, California